Taichi Teshima (born 16 October 1968) is a Japanese professional golfer.

Teshima was born in Fukuoka. He has won eight tournaments on the Japan Golf Tour, and featured in the top 100 of the Official World Golf Rankings. He played on the European Tour in 2007 after coming through qualifying school but failed to retain his card, finishing outside the top 150 of the Order of Merit.

Professional wins (13)

Japan Golf Tour wins (8)

 The Japan Open Golf Championship is also a Japan major championship.

Japan Golf Tour playoff record (2–4)

Japan Challenge Tour wins (2)
1995 Sanko 72 Open, Korakuen Cup (4th)

Other wins (1)
2019 Kyusyu Open

Japan PGA Senior Tour wins (2)
2019 Kanehide Senior Okinawa Open Golf Tournament
2021 Japan Senior Open Golf Championship

Results in major championships

Note: Teshima never played in the Masters Tournament or the U.S. Open.

CUT = missed the half-way cut

Results in World Golf Championships

"T" = Tied

Team appearances
World Cup (representing Japan): 1997
Dynasty Cup (representing Japan): 2003

See also
2006 European Tour Qualifying School graduates

References

External links

Japanese male golfers
Japan Golf Tour golfers
European Tour golfers
Sportspeople from Fukuoka Prefecture
People from Tagawa, Fukuoka
1968 births
Living people